Mark Lloyd may refer to

Mark Lloyd (lawyer), American journalist and lawyer
Mark Lloyd (boxer) (born 1975), English boxer
Mark Lloyd (car designer), British industrial designer